The Rom is a Grade II listed skatepark in Hornchurch, East London, England. Built in 1978, and designed by Adrian Rolt of G-Force, it is the most completely preserved purpose-built skatepark in England. It is the first skatepark in Europe to achieve listed status and the second such structure worldwide.

History
It was built and opened in August 1978 and is named after the adjacent River Rom. It was designed by Adrian Rolt of G-Force. Rolt is considered the leading skatepark designer of the 1970s. In 1979 John Greenwood took control of the Rom Skatepark and with the help of his business acumen, he has managed to keep the Rom open for skateboarders and BMXers until 2018. In 1979 Andy lomas showed up with a mongoose super goose after years of skating it and started the BMX skatepark revolution. 

In 2014 it was given Grade II listed status becoming only the second skateboard park in the world to achieve preservation status after the Bro Bowl in Tampa, Florida. The Bro Bowl has subsequently been demolished, 3D scanned and rebuilt in a different location of the same park area meaning that Rom is the only heritage listed full size skatepark in existence.

A film about the history of the park - Rom Boys: 40 Years of Rad is currently on general release on major streaming platforms .

Layout
The central  is surfaced in Shotcrete pressurised concrete.

See also
Harrow Skate Park
Bro Bowl, Florida, USA, first skatepark listed on a national historic registry, in 2013

References

External links

Grade II listed buildings in the London Borough of Havering
Skateboarding spots
Skateparks in the United Kingdom
1978 establishments in England
Tourist attractions in the London Borough of Havering
Hornchurch
Buildings and structures completed in 1978
20th-century architecture in the United Kingdom
Grade II listed sports and recreation buildings
Listed sports venues in England